Kids of the Majestic is a 2009 documentary film made in Bangalore, India.  It was directed by Dylan Verrechia, and co-produced by Suhas Radhakrishna that follows a group of orphans in the Majestic railway station of Bangalore.

Kids of the Majestic won the Artivist Award for Best Feature in Children's Advocacy Category at the 2010 Artivist Film Festival & Awards, and the Directing and Writing Insight Awards of Recognition at the National Association of Film and Digital Media Artists.

Synopsis
Every day, a sea of passengers floods the Majestic Railway Station of Bangalore City. Beneath the commotion of commuters, a group of orphans live beneath the station, collecting the trash that the passengers have left behind. The filmmakers befriended these children who, uneasily and slowly, opened up to them, sharing their life stories as no one before has ever heard. This documentary upholds a strong moral content by not only depicting the reality and hardship of these children, but also the positive aspect of this social group that works within its community. Kids of the Majestic is a documentary by filmmaker Dylan Verrechia and Dr. Suhas Radhakrishna that follows a group of such orphans: Rafik, a smiling young drug addict; Mental Manja, nicknamed "mental" because he didn't speak until he was 10; Arun-Badur, the artist and the writer; Baba, who at 8 has travelled throughout India alone; and Joti, mother-to-be at 16, who was abused at 9.

References

External links
 
 Earth Times
 PRWeb

Documentary films about street children
Indian documentary films
2000s Kannada-language films
2009 films
Culture of Bangalore
2009 documentary films